Ranko Žeravica (17 November 1929 – 29 October 2015) was a Serbian professional basketball coach. With a career that spanned over 50 years, he is most noted for his work with the senior Yugoslav national team, during the 1960s, 1970s, and early 1980s. In particular, Žeravica's single biggest achievement was guiding the country to its first ever major competition win — a gold medal on home soil, at the 1970 FIBA World Championship — leading to a huge expansion of the game of basketball throughout Yugoslavia. 

In 2007, he was enshrined into the FIBA Hall of Fame. Ranko Žeravica Sports Hall was named after him in his honor, in 2016.

Early life
Born to father Milorad, and mother Gordana, in the village of Dragutinovo (before it merged with Beodra into Novo Miloševo), Žeravica's education started in his village and continued in Kikinda, where he traveled every day by train. His family stemmed from Herzegovina by ancestry, having moved several generations before his birth to the Mošorin area, where they became wealthy farmers and land owners.

Coaching career

Club coaching career
After he ended his basketball playing career, Žeravica worked as the head coach of various clubs throughout his career. He won the FIBA Korać Cup championship in 1978, and the Yugoslav League championship in 1996.

Yugoslavia national basketball team
Žeravica was the head coach of the senior men's Yugoslavia national basketball team to gold medals at the 1980 Summer Olympic Games and 1970 FIBA World Championship; as well as to silver medals at the 1968 Summer Olympic Games, 1967 FIBA World Championship, 1969 EuroBasket, and 1971 EuroBasket. He also coached Yugoslavia to the bronze medal at the 1982 FIBA World Championship.

He was also the head coach of Yugoslavia at the 1972 Summer Olympic Games and the 1967 EuroBasket.

 1967–72  Yugoslavia
 ......1980  Yugoslavia
 ......1980  Argentina (technical adviser)
 ......1982  Yugoslavia

Health problems and death

Ranko Žeravica had a history of cardiac problems. In 2009, he suffered a heart attack and had a triple bypass surgery. In early 2015, he was admitted to hospital due to chest pain and was diagnosed with a mild heart attack. He had a coronary stent surgery and was soon discharged from hospital.

Žeravica died on 29 October 2015, aged 85, at his Belgrade home.

In popular culture 
 In the 2015 Serbian sports drama We Will Be the World Champions, Žeravica was portrayed by Sergej Trifunović.

See also 
 FIBA Basketball World Cup winning head coaches
 Ranko Žeravica Sports Hall
 We Will Be the World Champions

References

External links
 FIBA Hall of Fame page on Žeravica

1929 births
2015 deaths
Burials at Belgrade New Cemetery
FC Barcelona Bàsquet coaches
FIBA Hall of Fame inductees
Juvecaserta Basket coaches
KK Crvena zvezda assistant coaches
KK Crvena zvezda head coaches
KK Crvena Zvezda executives
KK Partizan coaches
KK Split coaches
Liga ACB head coaches
BKK Radnički coaches
BKK Radnički players
Serbian expatriate basketball people in Croatia
Serbian expatriate basketball people in Italy
Serbian expatriate basketball people in Spain
Serbian men's basketball coaches
Serbian men's basketball players
Yugoslav basketball coaches
Yugoslav men's basketball players